The 1976–77 Phoenix Suns season was the ninth season for the Phoenix Suns of the National Basketball Association. With injuries limiting the team to only six games with a full roster, the Suns plummeted to the bottom of the Pacific division standings, missing the playoffs after appearing in the Finals just one season prior. The Suns were led by head coach John MacLeod and played all home games in Arizona Veterans Memorial Coliseum.

Offseason

NBA Draft

Roster
{| class="toccolours" style="font-size: 85%; width: 100%;"
|-
! colspan="2" style="background-color: #423189;  color: #FF8800; text-align: center;" | Phoenix Suns roster
|- style="background-color: #FF8800; color: #423189;   text-align: center;"
! Players !! Coaches
|-
| valign="top" |
{| class="sortable" style="background:transparent; margin:0px; width:100%;"
! Pos. !! # !! Nat. !! Name !! Height !! Weight !! DOB (Y-M-D) !! From
|-

Regular season

Standings

Record vs. opponents

Game log

!!Streak
|-
|- align="center" bgcolor="#ffcccc"
| 1
| October 22
| @ New Orleans
| L 98–111
| Alvan Adams (29)
| Louisiana Superdome12,234
| 0–1
| L 1
|- align="center" bgcolor="#ffcccc"
| 2
| October 23
| @ Houston
| L 126–129
| Alvan Adams (29)
| The Summit6,385
| 0–2
| L 2
|- align="center" bgcolor="#ffcccc"
| 3
| October 27
| @ San Antonio
| L 106–115
| Alvan Adams (24)
| HemisFair Arena8,919
| 0–3
| L 3
|- align="center" bgcolor="#ccffcc"
| 4
| October 29
| @ Chicago
| W 95–82
| Gar Heard (23)
| Chicago Stadium9,318
| 1–3
| W 1
|- align="center" bgcolor="#ffcccc"
| 5
| October 30
| @ Denver
| L 107–113
| Gar Heard (28)
| McNichols Sports Arena17,608
| 1–4
| L 1
|-
!!Streak
|-
|- align="center" bgcolor="#ffcccc"
| 6
| November 5
| @ Seattle
| L 84–88
| Ricky Sobers (18)
| Seattle Center Coliseum11,902
| 1–5
| L 2
|- align="center" bgcolor="#ccffcc"
| 7
| November 11
| Indiana
| W 108–98
| Ricky Sobers,Paul Westphal (18)
| Arizona Veterans Memorial Coliseum10,152
| 2–5
| W 1
|- align="center" bgcolor="#ffcccc"
| 8
| November 13
| Cleveland
| L 90–103
| Ricky Sobers (20)
| Arizona Veterans Memorial Coliseum8,671
| 2–6
| L 1
|- align="center" bgcolor="#ccffcc"
| 9
| November 17
| Milwaukee
| W 103–95
| Dick Van Arsdale (19)
| Arizona Veterans Memorial Coliseum7,017
| 3–6
| W 1
|- align="center" bgcolor="#ffcccc"
| 10
| November 18
| @ Golden State
| L 111–131
| Ricky Sobers (19)
| Oakland–Alameda County Coliseum Arena9,965
| 3–7
| L 1
|- align="center" bgcolor="#ffcccc"
| 11
| November 19
| N.Y. Nets
| L 88–90
| Paul Westphal (17)
| Arizona Veterans Memorial Coliseum8,506
| 3–8
| L 2
|- align="center" bgcolor="#ccffcc"
| 12
| November 21
| Chicago
| W 101–96
| Paul Westphal (26)
| Arizona Veterans Memorial Coliseum7,589
| 4–8
| W 1
|- align="center" bgcolor="#ccffcc"
| 13
| November 25
| Washington
| W 104–98
| Paul Westphal (26)
| Arizona Veterans Memorial Coliseum8,614
| 5–8
| W 2
|- align="center" bgcolor="#ccffcc"
| 14
| November 27
| Seattle
| W 119–107
| Paul Westphal (25)
| Arizona Veterans Memorial Coliseum10,553
| 6–8
| W 3
|- align="center" bgcolor="#ffcccc"
| 15
| November 30
| @ Indiana
| L 97–103
| Paul Westphal (27)
| Market Square Arena8,581
| 6–9
| L 1
!!Streak
|-
|- align="center" bgcolor="#ccffcc"
| 16
| December 1
| @ N.Y. Nets
| W 106–96
| Paul Westphal (23)
| Nassau Veterans Memorial Coliseum5,103
| 7–9
| W 1
|- align="center" bgcolor="#ffcccc"
| 17
| December 3
| Portland
| L 99–113
| Ricky Sobers (21)
| Arizona Veterans Memorial Coliseum11,339
| 7–10
| L 1
|- align="center" bgcolor="#ccffcc"
| 18
| December 5
| San Antonio
| W 103–98 (OT)
| Paul Westphal (27)
| Arizona Veterans Memorial Coliseum8,235
| 8–10
| W 1
|- align="center" bgcolor="#ccffcc"
| 19
| December 8
| Houston
| W 116–95
| Paul Westphal (23)
| Arizona Veterans Memorial Coliseum8,117
| 9–10
| W 2
|- align="center" bgcolor="#ccffcc"
| 20
| December 10
| @ Boston
| W 107–103
| Ricky Sobers (25)
| Boston Garden12,878
| 10–10
| W 3
|- align="center" bgcolor="#ffcccc"
| 21
| December 11
| @ N.Y. Knicks
| L 96–112
| Alvan Adams (17)
| Madison Square Garden15,263
| 10–11
| L 1
|- align="center" bgcolor="#ccffcc"
| 22
| December 12
| @ Atlanta
| W 106–91
| Paul Westphal (28)
| Omni Coliseum2,507
| 11–11
| W 1
|- align="center" bgcolor="#ffcccc"
| 23
| December 14
| @ Buffalo
| L 99–108
| Ricky Sobers (23)
| Buffalo Memorial Auditorium7,132
| 11–12
| L 1
|- align="center" bgcolor="#ffcccc"
| 24
| December 15
| @ Philadelphia
| L 87–87
| Alvan Adams (27)
| The Spectrum11,363
| 11–13
| L 2
|- align="center" bgcolor="#ffcccc"
| 25
| December 17
| @ Los Angeles
| L 105–118
| Ricky Sobers,Paul Westphal (25)
| The Forum9,816
| 11–14
| L 3
|- align="center" bgcolor="#ffcccc"
| 26
| December 18
| Kansas City
| L 90–89
| Ricky Sobers (21)
| Arizona Veterans Memorial Coliseum9,482
| 11–15
| L 4
|- align="center" bgcolor="#ccffcc"
| 27
| December 23
| Buffalo
| W 107–92
| Ricky Sobers (28)
| Arizona Veterans Memorial Coliseum10,834
| 12–15
| W 1
|- align="center" bgcolor="#ccffcc"
| 28
| December 25
| Los Angeles
| W 113–96
| Paul Westphal (25)
| Arizona Veterans Memorial Coliseum13,274
| 13–15
| W 2
|- align="center" bgcolor="#ffcccc"
| 29
| December 28
| @ Denver
| L 102–110
| Paul Westphal (27)
| McNichols Sports Arena17,595
| 13–16
| L 1
|- align="center" bgcolor="#ccffcc"
| 30
| December 29
| Boston
| W 97–87
| Paul Westphal (30)
| Arizona Veterans Memorial Coliseum13,274
| 14–16
| W 1
!!Streak
|-
|- align="center" bgcolor="#ffcccc"
| 31
| January 2
| @ Kansas City
| L 88–89
| Paul Westphal (20)
| Omaha Civic Auditorium4,226
| 14–17
| L 1
|- align="center" bgcolor="#ffcccc"
| 32
| January 4
| @ Milwaukee
| L 111–139
| Curtis Perry,Ira Terrell (20)
| MECCA Arena8,871
| 14–18
| L 2
|- align="center" bgcolor="#ffcccc"
| 33
| January 5
| @ Detroit
| L 115–118
| Alvan Adams (24)
| Cobo Arena6,249
| 14–19
| L 3
|- align="center" bgcolor="#ffcccc"
| 34
| January 7
| @ Washington
| L 89–99
| Paul Westphal (15)
| Capital Centre6,072
| 14–20
| L 4
|- align="center" bgcolor="#ffcccc"
| 35
| January 8
| @ N.Y. Knicks
| L 95–102
| Paul Westphal (31)
| Madison Square Garden18,589
| 14–21
| L 5
|- align="center" bgcolor="#ccffcc"
| 36
| January 10
| @ Atlanta
| W 93–92
| Paul Westphal (20)
| Omni Coliseum2,408
| 15–21
| W 1
|- align="center" bgcolor="#ffcccc"
| 37
| January 11
| @ Chicago
| L 90–93
| Paul Westphal (31)
| Chicago Stadium6,446
| 15–22
| L 1
|- align="center" bgcolor="#ccffcc"
| 38
| January 13
| Detroit
| W 131–101
| Paul Westphal (25)
| Arizona Veterans Memorial Coliseum13,274
| 16–22
| W 1
|- align="center" bgcolor="#ccffcc"
| 39
| January 15
| Cleveland
| W 94–79
| Paul Westphal (24)
| Arizona Veterans Memorial Coliseum13,274
| 17–22
| W 2
|- align="center" bgcolor="#ccffcc"
| 40
| January 19
| N.Y. Knicks
| W 97–90
| Paul Westphal (31)
| Arizona Veterans Memorial Coliseum13,035
| 18–22
| W 3
|- align="center" bgcolor="#ffcccc"
| 41
| January 20
| @ Golden State
| L 103–107
| Paul Westphal (25)
| Oakland–Alameda County Coliseum Arena10,886
| 18–23
| L 1
|- align="center" bgcolor="#ccffcc"
| 42
| January 21
| Indiana
| W 125–96
| Alvan Adams (29)
| Arizona Veterans Memorial Coliseum10,957
| 19–23
| W 1
|- align="center" bgcolor="#ccffcc"
| 43
| January 23
| Seattle
| W 98–88
| Paul Westphal (24)
| Arizona Veterans Memorial Coliseum13,274
| 20–23
| W 2
|- align="center" bgcolor="#ffcccc"
| 44
| January 25
| San Antonio
| L 108–116
| Paul Westphal (24)
| Arizona Veterans Memorial Coliseum10,814
| 20–24
| L 1
|- align="center" bgcolor="#ccffcc"
| 45
| January 27
| Philadelphia
| W 111–94
| Ron Lee (28)
| Arizona Veterans Memorial Coliseum13,274
| 21–24
| W 1
|- align="center" bgcolor="#ccffcc"
| 46
| January 29
| New Orleans
| W 118–102
| Paul Westphal (26)
| Arizona Veterans Memorial Coliseum13,274
| 22–24
| W 2
|- align="center" bgcolor="#ffcccc"
| 47
| January 30
| @ Portland
| L 91–97
| Paul Westphal (24)
| Memorial Coliseum12,311
| 22–25
| L 1
!!Streak
|-
|- align="center" bgcolor="#ccffcc"
| 48
| February 2
| Milwaukee
| W 130–113
| Paul Westphal (29)
| Arizona Veterans Memorial Coliseum7,364
| 23–25
| W 1
|- align="center" bgcolor="#ffcccc"
| 49
| February 4
| Golden State
| L 106–109
| Alvan Adams (29)
| Arizona Veterans Memorial Coliseum12,849
| 23–26
| L 1
|- align="center" bgcolor="#ccffcc"
| 50
| February 6
| Denver
| W 115–104
| Paul Westphal (32)
| Arizona Veterans Memorial Coliseum11,826
| 24–26
| W 1
|- align="center" bgcolor="#ccffcc"
| 51
| February 8
| Atlanta
| W 117–104
| Alvan Adams (34)
| Arizona Veterans Memorial Coliseum7,495
| 25–26
| W 2
|- align="center" bgcolor="#ffcccc"
| 52
| February 10
| Washington
| L 103–109
| Paul Westphal (29)
| Arizona Veterans Memorial Coliseum11,352
| 25–27
| L 1
|- align="center" bgcolor="#ffcccc"
| 53
| February 15
| @ Kansas City
| L 96–102
| Paul Westphal (30)
| Kemper Arena7,313
| 25–28
| L 2
|- align="center" bgcolor="#ffcccc"
| 54
| February 16
| @ Indiana
| L 93–111
| Ira Terrell (15)
| Market Square Arena9,553
| 25–29
| L 3
|- align="center" bgcolor="#ccffcc"
| 55
| February 18
| @ Philadelphia
| W 102–96
| Paul Westphal (22)
| The Spectrum16,660
| 26–29
| W 1
|- align="center" bgcolor="#ffcccc"
| 56
| February 19
| @ Cleveland
| L 88–92
| Paul Westphal (23)
| Coliseum at Richfield17,882
| 26–30
| L 1
|- align="center" bgcolor="#ffcccc"
| 57
| February 20
| @ Detroit
| L 107–109
| Ricky Sobers (25)
| Cobo Arena7,233
| 26–31
| L 2
|- align="center" bgcolor="#ffcccc"
| 58
| February 22
| @ Buffalo
| L 114–115
| Alvan Adams (47)
| Buffalo Memorial Auditorium6,143
| 26–32
| L 3
|- align="center" bgcolor="#ffcccc"
| 59
| February 24
| Houston
| L 106–109
| Paul Westphal (31)
| Arizona Veterans Memorial Coliseum9,835
| 26–33
| L 4
|- align="center" bgcolor="#ffcccc"
| 60
| February 26
| Boston
| L 104–108
| Paul Westphal (22)
| Arizona Veterans Memorial Coliseum12,353
| 26–34
| L 5
!!Streak
|-
|- align="center" bgcolor="#ffcccc"
| 61
| March 2
| Chicago
| L 104–108 (OT)
| Paul Westphal (26)
| Arizona Veterans Memorial Coliseum8,823
| 26–35
| L 6
|- align="center" bgcolor="#ffcccc"
| 62
| March 4
| Golden State
| L 87–101
| Alvan Adams (21)
| Arizona Veterans Memorial Coliseum8,750
| 26–36
| L 7
|- align="center" bgcolor="#ffccc"
| 63
| March 6
| @ Washington
| L 110–118
| Ricky Sobers (32)
| Capital Centre14,189
| 26–37
| L 8
|- align="center" bgcolor="#ffcccc"
| 64
| March 8
| @ San Antonio
| L 115–122
| Ricky Sobers,Paul Westphal (24)
| HemisFair Arena10,011
| 26–38
| L 9
|- align="center" bgcolor="#ffcccc"
| 65
| March 9
| @ Houston
| L 100–105
| Alvan Adams (26)
| The Summit6,421
| 26–39
| L 10
|- align="center" bgcolor="#ffcccc"
| 66
| March 11
| @ N.Y. Nets
| L 73–82
| Paul Westphal (16)
| Nassau Veterans Memorial Coliseum6,730
| 26–40
| L 11
|- align="center" bgcolor="#ffcccc"
| 67
| March 13
| @ Boston
| L 107–124
| Alvan Adams (29)
| Boston Garden14,859
| 26–41
| L 12
|- align="center" bgcolor="#ccffcc"
| 68
| March 16
| N.Y. Knicks
| W 124–91
| Paul Westphal (23)
| Arizona Veterans Memorial Coliseum9,177
| 27–41
| W 1
|- align="center" bgcolor="#ffcccc"
| 69
| March 18
| New Orleans
| L 100–104
| Paul Westphal (35)
| Arizona Veterans Memorial Coliseum10,285
| 27–42
| L 1
|- align="center" bgcolor="#ccffcc"
| 70
| March 20
| Portland
| W 126–106
| Alvan Adams (27)
| Arizona Veterans Memorial Coliseum7,174
| 28–42
| W 1
|- align="center" bgcolor="#ffcccc"
| 71
| March 24
| Buffalo
| L 102–107
| Paul Westphal (24)
| Arizona Veterans Memorial Coliseum8,410
| 28–43
| L 1
|- align="center" bgcolor="#ffcccc"
| 72
| March 25
| @ Los Angeles
| L 93–118
| Ira Terrell (22)
| The Forum13,507
| 28–44
| L 2
|- align="center" bgcolor="#ffcccc"
| 73
| March 26
| Los Angeles
| L 102–109
| Alvan Adams (27)
| Arizona Veterans Memorial Coliseum8,150
| 28–45
| L 3
|- align="center" bgcolor="#ccffcc"
| 74
| March 27
| @ Seattle
| W 121–100
| Ron Lee (33)
| Seattle Center Coliseum14,096
| 29–45
| W 1
|- align="center" bgcolor="#ccffcc"
| 75
| March 29
| @ Milwaukee
| W 122–110
| Paul Westphal (34)
| MECCA Arena8,945
| 30–45
| W 2
|- align="center" bgcolor="#ffcccc"
| 76
| March 30
| @ New Orleans
| L 100–112
| Alvan Adams (19)
| Louisiana Superdome6,237
| 30–46
| L 1
!!Streak
|-
|- align="center" bgcolor="#ccffcc"
| 77
| April 1
| Detroit
| W 133–116
| Paul Westphal (40)
| Arizona Veterans Memorial Coliseum8,506
| 31–46
| W 1
|- align="center" bgcolor="#ffcccc"
| 78
| April 3
| Denver
| L 109–124
| Ron Lee (28)
| Arizona Veterans Memorial Coliseum7,501
| 31–47
| L 1
|- align="center" bgcolor="#ccffcc"
| 79
| April 5
| Atlanta
| W 108–102
| Ricky Sobers (25)
| Arizona Veterans Memorial Coliseum7,668
| 32–47
| W 1
|- align="center" bgcolor="#ccffcc"
| 80
| April 7
| Kansas City
| W 121–110
| Paul Westphal (30)
| Arizona Veterans Memorial Coliseum8,462
| 33–47
| W 2
|- align="center" bgcolor="#ffcccc"
| 81
| April 8
| @ Portland
| L 111–122
| Alvan Adams (26)
| Memorial Coliseum12,536
| 33–48
| L 1
|- align="center" bgcolor="#ccffcc"
| 82
| April 10
| N.Y. Nets
| W 128–104
| Ron Lee (21)
| Arizona Veterans Memorial Coliseum8,476
| 34–48
| W 1
|-

Awards and honors

All-Star
 Paul Westphal was voted as a starter for the Western Conference in the All-Star Game. It was his first All-Star selection. Westphal finished first in voting among Western Conference guards with 163,173 votes.

Season
 Paul Westphal was named to the All-NBA First Team.
 Ron Lee was named to the NBA All-Rookie First Team.

Player statistics

Season

+ – Minimum 50 games played.

Transactions

Trades

Free agents

Additions

Subtractions

References

Phoenix Suns seasons
Phoenix